Joona Lautamaja (born 12 July 1995) is a Finnish professional footballer who plays as a midfielder.

References

1995 births
People from Seinäjoki
Living people
Finnish footballers
Seinäjoen Jalkapallokerho players
SJK Akatemia players
Kuopion Palloseura players
SC Kuopio Futis-98 players
Veikkausliiga players
Ykkönen players
Kakkonen players
Association football midfielders
Sportspeople from South Ostrobothnia